Liu Zhenli may refer to:

Liu Zhenli (footballer), a Chinese football goalkeeper
Liu Zhenli (general), a general (Shangjiang) of the People's Liberation Army (PLA)